The 1972 Iowa Hawkeyes baseball team represented the University of Iowa in the 1972 NCAA University Division baseball season. The head coach was Duane Banks, serving his 3rd year. The Hawkeyes finished the season in 7th place in the 1972 College World Series.

Roster

Schedule 

! style="" | Regular Season
|- valign="top" 

|- align="center" bgcolor="#ccffcc"
| 1 || March 25 || vs  || Unknown • Sun City, Arizona || 11–5 || 1–0 || 0–0
|- align="center" bgcolor="#ffcccc"
| 2 || March 25 || vs  || Unknown • Sun City, Arizona || 4–5 || 1–1 || 0–0
|- align="center" bgcolor="#ffcccc"
| 3 || March 27 || at  || Sancet Stadium • Tucson, Arizona || 1–10 || 1–2 || 0–0
|- align="center" bgcolor="#ccffcc"
| 4 || March 28 || at Arizona || Sancet Stadium • Tucson, Arizona || 2–9 || 2–2 || 0–0
|- align="center" bgcolor="#ffcccc"
| 5 || March 29 || at Arizona || Sancet Stadium • Tucson, Arizona || 6–7 || 2–3 || 0–0
|- align="center" bgcolor="#ffcccc"
| 6 || March 30 || at Arizona || Sancet Stadium • Tucson, Arizona || 13–22 || 2–4 || 0–0
|- align="center" bgcolor="#ccffcc"
| 7 || March 31 || at  || Unknown • Flagstaff, Arizona || 10–8 || 3–4 || 0–0
|-

|- align="center" bgcolor="#ccffcc"
| 8 || April 1 ||  || Unknown • Iowa City, Iowa || 19–1 || 4–4 || 0–0
|- align="center" bgcolor="#ccffcc"
| 9 || April 1 || Drake || Unknown • Iowa City, Iowa || 3–1 || 5–4 || 0–0
|- align="center" bgcolor="#ccffcc"
| 10 || April  ||  || Unknown • Iowa City, Iowa || 4–0 || 6–4 || 0–0
|- align="center" bgcolor="#ccffcc"
| 11 || April  || Cornell || Unknown • Iowa City, Iowa || 7–2 || 7–4 || 0–0
|- align="center" bgcolor="#ffcccc"
| 12 || April  || vs  || Unknown • Unknown || 1–3 || 7–5 || 0–0
|- align="center" bgcolor="#ffcccc"
| 13 || April  || vs Iowa State || Unknown • Unknown || 0–1 || 7–6 || 0–0
|- align="center" bgcolor="#ffcccc"
| 14 || April 14 || at  || Trautman Field • Columbus, Ohio || 2–3 || 7–7 || 0–1
|- align="center" bgcolor="#ccffcc"
| 15 || April 14 || at Ohio State || Trautman Field • Columbus, Ohio || 9–3 || 8–7 || 1–1
|- align="center" bgcolor="#ccffcc"
| 16 || April 15 || at  || Sembower Field • Bloomington, Indiana || 7–3 || 9–7 || 2–1
|- align="center" bgcolor="#ffcccc"
| 17 || April 15 || at Indiana || Sembower Field • Bloomington, Indiana || 1–2 || 9–8 || 2–2
|- align="center" bgcolor="#ffcccc"
| 18 || April  || vs  || Unknown • Unknown, Iowa || 1–8 || 9–9 || 2–2
|- align="center" bgcolor="#ccffcc"
| 19 || April  || vs Northern Iowa || Unknown • Unknown, Iowa || 10–5 || 10–9 || 2–2
|- align="center" bgcolor="#ffcccc"
| 20 || April 22 || at  || Ray Fisher Stadium • Ann Arbor, Michigan || 3–9 || 10–10 || 2–3
|- align="center" bgcolor="#ccffcc"
| 21 || April 22 || at Michigan || Ray Fisher Stadium • Ann Arbor, Michigan || 1–0 || 11–10 || 3–3
|- align="center" bgcolor="#ffcccc"
| 22 || April 25 || vs  || Unknown • Unknown || 4–5 || 11–11 || 3–3
|- align="center" bgcolor="#ffcccc"
| 23 || April 25 || vs Creighton || Unknown • Unknown || 6–9 || 11–12 || 3–3
|- align="center" bgcolor="#ccffcc"
| 24 || April 28 ||  || Unknown • Iowa City, Iowa || 5–4 || 12–12 || 4–3
|- align="center" bgcolor="#ccffcc"
| 25 || April 28 || Illinois || Unknown • Iowa City, Iowa || 3–0 || 13–12 || 5–3
|- align="center" bgcolor="#ccffcc"
| 26 || April 30 || at  || Lambert Field • West Lafayette, Indiana || 4–0 || 14–12 || 6–3
|- align="center" bgcolor="#ccffcc"
| 27 || April 30 || at Purdue || Lambert Field • West Lafayette, Indiana || 12–1 || 15–12 || 7–3
|-

|- align="center" bgcolor="#ccffcc"
| 28 || May || vs  || Unknown • Unknown || 3–2 || 16–12 || 8–3
|- align="center" bgcolor="#ccffcc"
| 29 || May || vs Minnesota || Unknown • Unknown || 6–2 || 17–12 || 9–3
|- align="center" bgcolor="#ccffcc"
| 30 || May || vs  || Unknown • Unknown || 10–2 || 18–12 || 10–3
|- align="center" bgcolor="#ccffcc"
| 31 || May || vs Wisconsin || Unknown • Unknown || 4–0 || 19–12 || 11–3
|- align="center" bgcolor="#ccffcc"
| 32 || May || vs  || Unknown • Unknown || 6–1 || 19–12 || 12–3
|- align="center" bgcolor="#ccffcc"
| 33 || May || vs Northwestern || Unknown • Unknown || 10–8 || 20–12 || 13–3
|- align="center" bgcolor="#ffcccc"
| 34 || May || vs  || Unknown • Unknown || 3–4 || 20–13 || 13–3
|- align="center" bgcolor="#ffcccc"
| 35 || May || vs Western Michigan || Unknown • Unknown || 4–5 || 20–14 || 13–3
|-

|-
|-
! style="" | Postseason
|- valign="top"

|- align="center" bgcolor="#ffcccc"
| 36 || May ||  || Steller Field • Bowling Green, Ohio || 2–7 || 20–15 || 13–3
|- align="center" bgcolor="#ccffcc"
| 37 || May ||  || Steller Field • Bowling Green, Ohio || 8–1 || 21–15 || 13–3
|- align="center" bgcolor="#ccffcc"
| 38 || May || Central Michigan || Steller Field • Bowling Green, Ohio || 4–3 || 22–15 || 13–3
|- align="center" bgcolor="#ccffcc"
| 39 || May || at  || Steller Field • Bowling Green, Ohio || 4–2 || 23–15 || 13–3
|- align="center" bgcolor="#ccffcc"
| 40 || May || at Bowling Green || Steller Field • Bowling Green, Ohio || 7–5 || 24–15 || 13–3
|-

|- align="center" bgcolor="#ffcccc"
| 41 || June 10 || vs Arizona State || Omaha Municipal Stadium • Omaha, Nebraska || 1–2 || 24–16 || 13–3
|- align="center" bgcolor="#ffcccc"
| 42 || June 10 || vs  || Omaha Municipal Stadium • Omaha, Nebraska || 9–13 || 24–17 || 13–3
|-

References 

Iowa Hawkeyes baseball seasons
Iowa Hawkeyes baseball
College World Series seasons
Big Ten Conference baseball champion seasons
Iowa